The expander cycle is a power cycle of a bipropellant rocket engine. In this cycle, the fuel is used to cool the engine's combustion chamber, picking up heat and changing phase. The now heated and gaseous fuel then powers the turbine that drives the engine's fuel and oxidizer pumps before being injected into the combustion chamber and burned.

Because of the necessary phase change, the expander cycle is thrust limited by the square–cube law. When a bell-shaped nozzle is scaled, the nozzle surface area with which to heat the fuel increases as the square of the radius, but the volume of fuel to be heated increases as the cube of the radius.  Thus beyond approximately 300 kN (70,000 lbf) of thrust, there is no longer enough nozzle area to heat enough fuel to drive the turbines and hence the fuel pumps. Higher thrust levels can be achieved using a bypass expander cycle where a portion of the fuel bypasses the turbine and or thrust chamber cooling passages and goes directly to the main chamber injector. Non-toroidal aerospike engines are not subject to the limitations from the square-cube law because the engine's linear shape does not scale isometrically: the fuel flow and nozzle area scale linearly with the engine's width.  All expander cycle engines need to use a cryogenic fuel such as liquid hydrogen, liquid methane, or liquid propane that easily reaches its boiling point.

Some expander cycle engines may use a gas generator of some kind to start the turbine and run the engine until the heat input from the thrust chamber and nozzle skirt increases as the chamber pressure builds up.

Some examples of an expander cycle engine are the Aerojet Rocketdyne RL10 and the Vinci engine for the future Ariane 6.

Expander bleed cycle 

This operational cycle is a modification of the traditional expander cycle. In the bleed (or open) cycle, instead of routing all of the heated propellant through the turbine and sending it back to be combusted, only a small portion of the heated propellant is used to drive the turbine and is then bled off, being vented overboard without going through the combustion chamber. The other portion is injected into the combustion chamber. Bleeding off the turbine exhaust allows for a higher turbopump efficiency by decreasing backpressure and maximizing the pressure drop through the turbine. Compared with a standard expander cycle, this allows higher engine thrust at the cost of efficiency by dumping the turbine exhaust.

The Mitsubishi LE-5A was the world's first expander bleed cycle engine to be put into operational service.

Dual expander 
In a similar way that the staged combustion can be implemented separately on the oxidizer and fuel on the full flow cycle, the expander cycle can be implemented on two separate paths as the dual expander cycle. The use of hot gases of the same chemistry as the liquid for the turbine and pump side of the turbopumps eliminates the need for purges and some failure modes. Additionally, when the density of the fuel and oxidizer is significantly different, as it is in the H2/LOX case, the optimal turbopump speeds differ so much that they need a gearbox between the fuel and oxidizer pumps. The use of dual expander cycle, with separate turbines, eliminates this failure-prone piece of equipment.

Dual expander cycle can be implemented by either using separated sections on the regenerative cooling system for the fuel and the oxidizer, or by using a single fluid for cooling and a heat exchanger to boil the second fluid. In the first case, for example, you could use the fuel to cool the combustion chamber, and the oxidizer to cool the nozzle. In the second case, you could use the fuel to cool the whole engine and a heat exchanger to boil the oxidizer.

Advantages 
The expander cycle has a number of advantages over other designs:
Low temperatureAfter they have turned gaseous, the propellants are usually near room temperature, and do very little or no damage to the turbine, allowing the engine to be reusable. In contrast gas-generator or staged combustion engines operate their turbines at high temperature.
Tolerance During the development of the RL10 engineers were worried that insulation foam mounted on the inside of the tank might break off and damage the engine. They tested this by putting loose foam in a fuel tank and running it through the engine. The RL10 chewed it up without problems or noticeable degradation in performance. Conventional gas-generators are in practice miniature rocket engines, with all the complexity that implies. Blocking even a small part of a gas generator can lead to a hot spot, which can cause violent loss of the engine. Using the engine bell as a 'gas generator' also makes it very tolerant of fuel contamination because of the wider fuel flow channels used.
Inherent safety Because a bell-type expander-cycle engine is thrust limited, it can easily be designed to withstand its maximum thrust conditions. In other engine types, a stuck fuel valve or similar problem can lead to engine thrust spiraling out of control due to unintended feedback systems. Other engine types require complex mechanical or electronic controllers to ensure this does not happen. Expander cycles are by design incapable of malfunctioning that way.

Usage 
Expander cycle engines include the following:
Aerojet Rocketdyne RL10
Pratt & Whitney RL60
ArianeGroup Vinci
CADB & Pratt & Whitney RD-0146
Chinese YF-75D
Mitsubishi Heavy Industries LE-5A / 5B
Mitsubishi Heavy Industries LE-9
Aerojet Rocketdyne & MHI MARC-60 (MB-60)
Blue Origin BE-3U and BE-7
 Avio M10

Comparison of upper-stage expander-cycle engines

See also 
Gas-generator cycle
Combustion tap-off cycle
Staged combustion cycle
Pressure-fed engine

References

External links 
Rocket power cycles

Rocket propulsion
Rocket engines
 
Spacecraft propulsion
Engineering thermodynamics